The term environmental credit crunch refers to a crisis (which may be economic in origin) which exposes humanity's inability to indefinitely consume finite natural resources in order to sustain economic activity and a standard of living. The term is often juxtaposed with the financial credit crunch of 2008.

The concept of credit in an environmental sense 

Credit allows a borrower to increase today’s standard of living at the expense of some future standard of living. Thus in financial terms, credit allows a consumer to spend a large amount of money today (raising their standard of living) while reducing their disposable income as the debt is repaid (lowering their future standard of living relative to its potential). In environmental terms, credit can be thought of as raising today’s standard of living through the consumption of finite resources (like oil). This action will lower the future standard of living, as future consumers will be denied to opportunity to consume.

A credit crunch occurs when the act of using credit is no longer possible, normally as a result of a significant exogenous shock. A financial credit crunch is normally the result of a sharp decline in the willingness of banks of financial markets to lend money. In environmental terms, the credit crunch comes about as finite resources are depleted significantly.

Earth Overshoot Day 

The concept of an environmental credit is aligned to Earth Overshoot Day (Ecological Debt Day). Earth Overshoot Day is the point in the year at which the world economy moves from generating growth with renewable resources, to generating growth with non-renewable resources. After Earth Overshoot Day, humanity is dependent on environmental credit to sustain its standard of living. Currently just over a quarter of the year is spent living on environmental credit.

Development of the concept 

The use of the term “environmental credit crunch” began to emerge as academics tried to highlight the extent of the potential disruption of environmental depletion in economic terms by using language associated with the ongoing financial credit crunch. The phrase "environmental credit crunch" was used to evoke the scale of the challenge (and the need for a policy response) as early as October 2010, as the financial credit crunch was starting to take hold. The Chartered Institute of Water and Environmental Management in the UK was one of the earliest to adopt the phrase as part of their campaign for dramatic policy action. World Wild Fund for Nature Director General James Leape also used the phrase around the same time.

The most detailed examination of the environmental credit crunch and its interaction with the financial credit crunch occurs in “From Red to Green? How the financial credit crunch could bankrupt the environment” by Donovan and Hudson. This argues that the financial credit crunch will have both positive and negative consequences for the simultaneous environmental credit crunch. As a result, policy makers need to be more flexible in their responses to both credit problems.

Another recent book that explores the topics without using the term "environmental credit crunch" specifically is, Richard Heinberg's "The End of Growth: Adapting to Our New Economic Reality". The book opens with a review of the financial crisis and the much discussed financial limits to future growth before addressing the corresponding environmental limits to growth.

References 

Financial crises
Environmental economics
Environmental issues